Oluwafemi Oladapo (born in August 22, 1982) better known as Slimcase, is a Nigerian singer, songwriter and hype man, and actor, He is known for featuring on fellow Nigerian artist D'banj's single,'Issa Banger' and 'Gucci Snake', by Wizkid with a new dance routine known as 'shaku shaku'

He has collaborated with Nigerian artistes like Wizkid, Tiwa Savage, Yemi Alade, Mr Eazi, 2Baba.

Early life
He was born in Ikorodu, Lagos State, Nigeria, on August 22, 1982. grew up in Lagos with his parents.
He received both his first school leaving certificate and his West African senior school certificate in Lagos, where he completed his elementary and secondary school education.

Career
In 2018, he featured on commercially acclaimed Nigerian Street-Hop single 'Shepeterri' by Idowest

In 2018, he was nominated for The Headies Best Street-Hop Artiste and Best new act at Nigeria Entertainment Awards

In 2018, he won best collaboration at the City People Entertainment Awards

Discography
Kalamo
Furoonaire
Hawahoo
Lambaxtra
Watch
Azaman feat. 2baba, Dj Neptune & Peruzzi
Ijoba
Bushman
Pongilah feat. Zlatan
MajeOmo
Mr Dickson
Focus Vibe
Otumba Lamba
Oshozondi
Oh Baby Ringtone

As featured
Shepeteri
 Iworiwo Ft. 2baba Shawa Shawa Ft Dj Neptune, Olamide, CDQ
Diet (DJ Enimoney, Reminisce & Tiwa Savage)
Gucci Snake (Wizkid)
Mari (Orezi)
Naija Issa Goal (Naira Marley)
Malowa (Omawumi)
Merule (Mz Kiss)
Issa banger (D’banj)
Shawa Shawa
Yaji (Yemi Alade)
Overload (Mr Eazi)

Awards and nominations

References

1982 births
Nigerian singer-songwriters
21st-century Nigerian singers
Living people
Nigerian male film actors